Hadena circumvadis is a species of cutworm or dart moth in the family Noctuidae. It is found in North America.

The MONA or Hodges number for Hadena circumvadis is 10322.

References

Further reading

 
 
 

Hadena
Articles created by Qbugbot
Moths described in 1902